Gargas is a commune in the Vaucluse department in the Provence-Alpes-Côte d'Azur region in southeastern France. The writer Raymond Jean (1925–2012) died in Gargas.

Gargas is the site of old ochre mining operations. In 2009 the Mine d'Ocre de Bruoux was opened for tourists.

See also
Communes of the Vaucluse department
Luberon

References

Communes of Vaucluse